A crocket (or croquet) is a small, independent decorative element common in Gothic architecture. The name derives from the diminutive of the French croc, meaning "hook", due to the resemblance of a crocket to a bishop's crook-shaped crosier.

Description
Crockets, in the form of stylized carvings of curled  leaves, buds or flowers, are used at regular intervals to decorate (for example) the sloping edges of spires, finials, pinnacles, and wimpergs.

As ornaments
When crockets decorate the capitals of columns, these are called crocket capitals. This element is also used as an ornament on furniture and metalwork in the Gothic style.

Examples
 All Souls College – Oxford
 Canterbury Cathedral
 Notre Dame Cathedral – Paris
 León Cathedral – Spain
 Duke Chapel

References

External links

 

Church architecture
Ornaments (architecture)